The Maysville roadcut, located in northeastern Kentucky, features Upper Ordovician rock and fossils. Maysville is located in Mason County, Kentucky and contains a large roadcut along the U.S. Route 68 highway. The Maysville roadcut lies on the Clyde T. Barbour Parkway. The roadcut was human-made in the 1950s and consists of rock from the Ordovician period that is roughly 450 million years old. Maysville provides an opportunity to observe the stratigraphy of the formations present of the Ordovician time period.

The roadcut is made up of three different formations: the Kope, Fairview, and Bellevue in ascending order. They are broken up into different layers that can be identified by different sediments and fossils present. The Maysville roadcut formations are made up primarily of shale and limestone. The abundance of each rock type differs amongst the three formations. Shale dominates in the Bellevue formation. Limestone is most prevalent in Fairview formation. A mix of limestone and shale is found in the Kope formation.

There are a wide variety of invertebrate fossils that can be found at the Maysville roadcut, including trilobites, cephalopods, crinoids, gastropods, brachiopods, bryozoans. The abundance and presence of fossil types differs depending on the formation viewed. This is due to the differences in ecosystems and environmental conditions at the time of each formation. The Ordovician was a time when the land we know today was covered by a hot, shallow sea. The Cincinnati Arch, where Maysville can be found, was at about twenty three degrees south of the equator. Roadcuts such as Maysville roadcut have attracted those interested in collecting fossils, ranging from professionals at universities to amateurs in the area. Part of Maysville fossil collecting is fossil identification. Fossil identification books for Ohio and the Cincinnati area can serve as a resource. Furthermore, the Dry Dredgers is an amateur fossil collecting and geology group located in Cincinnati, Ohio. Their website also provides information for fossil identification.

Kope formation 

The Kope formation is the lowest layer at the Maysville roadcut. It is the oldest formation present from the late Ordovician period at Maysville and dates to approximately 460-450 million years ago.

The Kope formation is the easiest to access at the Maysville roadcut and can be climbed readily with proper hiking equipment. Common fossils found in this formation include trilobites, which are often more abundant than at the Fairview and Bellevue formations. Trilobites are found in both rolled and prone positions. The Kope formation mostly contains whole rolled Flexicalymene trilobites and fragments of Isotelus trilobites. An abundance of trilobites can be collected at the North end of the Kope formation, closer to the top of the formation. Brachiopods can be found in the Kope in both small or broken fragments and whole specimens. Crinoid stems are abundant both as stacked fragments within a rock or individual discs lying within the sediment. Fossilized gastropods and bryozoans are abundant in the Kope formation. Crinoid stems, gastropods, and bryozoans are found scattered throughout the Kope. Few loose cephalopods and many small cephalopods settled in large slabs of rock are also present. Cephalopods are most commonly found near the bottom of the Kope formation. Many trace fossils are found within this layer, but the Fairview formation contains a greater amount of trace fossils. Many fossils are buried in large slabs of fossiliferous limestone and shale. The Kope formation has a blue-gray color that is mostly shale with some limestone.

Fairview formation 

The Fairview formation is located in between the Kope and Bellevue formations, making it younger than Kope and older than Bellevue. The approximate age of the Fairview formation is about 455-450 million years ago.

In order to access this formation, you must climb a trail on the south end of Maysville roadcut, where visitors should be wary of the ticks and poison ivy. This formation comprises many different fossils mostly found in abundant large slabs of limestone. These different fossils include a large amount of brachiopods smaller in size than the brachiopods found in the Bellevue formation as well as many brachiopod fragments. In addition, Fairview contains a large amount of small and broken crinoid stems. The Fairview formation contains an abundance of rock slabs, some of which have large cephalopods in them. Cephalopods are very abundant in the Fairview formation, and are larger in size than those found in the Kope formation, due to the increase in food availability for these predators following the late Cambrian period. Cephalopods survived well in this time period because they were able to prey on the many gastropods and mollusks that are also found in this formation. Visitors will find the majority of these fossils in the lower part of the Fairview formation as the upper part is difficult to access and potentially dangerous.

Bellevue formation 

The Bellevue formation is the uppermost rock bed layer of the Maysville roadcut. Being the uppermost formation of the Maysville roadcut, this is the youngest layer of the Ordovician period, dating to around 455-450 million years ago.

This formation is the least accessible of the three formations at Maysville, requiring one to hike up a steep trail located near the South end of the roadcut. It is important to be cautious while hiking the trail to Bellevue as ticks and poison ivy are prevalent in the forested areas. North America was underwater during the Ordovician period therefore the Bellevue formation was formed from shallow water deposits, consisting mostly of shale. Within the layers of shale, brachiopod fragments are prevalent, and commonly vinlandostrophia are found. The Bellevue formation contains many small crinoid stems due to the deposits that came from the shallow water in the most recent years of the Ordovician period. The base of the Bellevue formation contains a large collection of echinoderms. Crinoids are a part of the echinoderm phylum. The Bellevue formation also comprises larger fragments of bryozoa as well as vinlandostrophia in comparison to the Fairview and Kope formations. Visitors can find a majority of these fossils in the lower and base part of the Bellevue formation. The top of Bellevue along with parts of the base are difficult to access and potentially dangerous.

Fossil Identification of Maysville Specimens

Overview 
Fossil collecting is prevalent in the Cincinnati tri-state area among Kentucky, Indiana, and Ohio. Roadcuts such as Maysville provide a unique opportunity for fossil hunters to view well preserved fossils in relatively open stratigraphy layers. Many of the fossils found are often loose and scattered among the rock. With some being found in larger chunks or slabs of rock. They can be found whole or fragmented. Two written sources for Maysville fossil identification are the books: Fossils of Ohio and Cincinnati Fossils.

Dry Dredgers 
Due to the exuberant amount of fossils in the area it has drawn the attention of amateur and professional fossil hunters. This location in particular is home to the amateur fossil collecting and geologist association, the Dry Dredgers. Formed in 1942, they are the oldest fossil club in North America and are located in Cincinnati. The club is ongoing and operates with members across the country, and they have an accessible Facebook page where visitors can get unknown fossils identified. Their website has a plethora of information about fossil identification with photo examples as well. The website can be found in the reference section.

References 

Maysville, Kentucky
U.S. Route 68
Road cuttings
Geology of Kentucky